Deer Creek Township, Ohio, may refer to:

Deer Creek Township, Madison County, Ohio
Deer Creek Township, Pickaway County, Ohio

Ohio township disambiguation pages